The Battersea Railway Bridge (originally called the Cremorne Bridge, after the riverside public Cremorne Gardens in Chelsea, and formerly commonly referred to as the Battersea New Bridge) is a bridge across the River Thames in London, between Battersea and Fulham. Owned by Network Rail Infrastructure Ltd (who use Chelsea River Bridge as its official name ), it links Battersea to the extreme north-east part of Fulham, known as Chelsea Harbour or Imperial Wharf, a 21st-century-rebuilt area on the south side of Chelsea Creek. The bridge is used by the West London Line of the London Overground from Clapham Junction to Willesden Junction.

History

The bridge was designed by William Baker, chief engineer of the London and North Western Railway, and was opened on 2 March 1863 at a cost of £87,000.  It carries two tracks and consists of five  lattice girder arches set on stone piers.

A three-arch brick viaduct carries the line on the north side of the bridge, with one arch having been opened to provide a pedestrian route under the railway, as part of the Thames Path. On the south side are four arches, two of which are used as storage for the residents of a houseboat community moored immediately downstream, and another one of which was opened to Thames Path pedestrian traffic as part of the Lombard Wharf development.

The bridge was strengthened and refurbished in 1969, and again in 1992.  During a high tide in late 2003, the structure was struck by a refuse-barge damaging some lower structural elements significantly: repairs were completed in early 2004.

In November 2013, planning permission was granted for the Diamond Jubilee Footbridge, extending the two central piers of the bridge upstream.

Trains crossing are subject to a 20/30 mph speed limit (locomotive-hauled traffic is restricted to 20 mph, all other traffic is limited to 30 mph).

The bridge was declared a Grade II* listed structure in 2008, providing protection to preserve its special character from unsympathetic development.

See also 
 Crossings of the River Thames
 List of bridges in London

Notes and references
References

Notes

Further reading

External links

 

Railway bridges in London
Bridges completed in 1893
History of the London Borough of Hammersmith and Fulham
Buildings and structures in the London Borough of Hammersmith and Fulham
Transport in the London Borough of Hammersmith and Fulham
Transport in the London Borough of Wandsworth
Bridges across the River Thames
London Overground
Grade II* listed buildings in the London Borough of Wandsworth
Fulham
Grade II* listed bridges in London
Grade II* listed railway bridges and viaducts